Timon in Love is a 1733 comedy play by John Kelly. It is an adaptation of a French play based on Timon of Athens and is not related to Shakespeare's Timon of Athens.

The original Drury Lane cast included Roger Bridgewater as Pierrot, Kitty Clive as Mercury, Henry Norris as Plutus and Christiana Horton as Eucharis.

References

Bibliography
 Burling, William J. A Checklist of New Plays and Entertainments on the London Stage, 1700-1737. Fairleigh Dickinson Univ Press, 1992.
 Nicoll, Allardyce. A History of Early Eighteenth Century Drama: 1700-1750. CUP Archive, 1927.

1733 plays
British plays
West End plays
Comedy plays